Mackenzie River is a locality in the Isaac Region, Queensland, Australia.

Geography 
The Mackenzie River forms the southern and eastern boundary of the locality.

In the far north of the locality are two protected areas, the Junee National Park and the Junee State Forest.

The locality is within the Bowen Basin coalfields and there are a number of active coal mines in the locality, including Foxleigh, Oak Park and Lake Lindsay coal mines with other areas being considered for future mines.

Railway lines for the Blackwater rail system pass through the south of the locality. However, the mines within the locality are not serviced by these lines but via the lines in neighbouring Middlemount.

The Fitzroy Developmental Road passes from south-east to north-west through the locality.

History 
The locality's  name presumably derives from the Mackenzie River, which in turn was named by explorer Ludwig Leichhardt on 10 January 1845, after his friend pastoralist Evan Mackenzie of Kilcoy Station.

Mackenzie River State School opened on 21 May 1973 but closed in 2018 after having no students enrol in 2017. It was at 31145 Fitzroy Developmental Road.

The Foxleigh opencut coal mine was established in 1999. Oak Park opencut coal mine was established in 2004. Lake Lindsay opencut coal mine was established in 2008.

Education 
There are no schools in Mackenzie River. The nearest primary schools are in Middlemount and Tieri. The nearest secondary schools are in Middlemount, Blackwater and Capella.

References 

Isaac Region
Localities in Queensland